Albert Henry Hornby (29 July 1877 – 6 September 1952) was an English cricketer active from 1898 to 1914 who played for Lancashire. The son of A. N. Hornby, he was born in Church Minshull, Cheshire, and educated at Harrow School and Trinity College, Cambridge. He appeared in 292 first-class matches as a righthanded batsman and an occasional wicketkeeper. He scored 9,784 runs with a highest score of 129 among eight centuries and held 220 catches with one stumping. He was renowned for his daring running between the wickets, quite unusual in his time. GL Jessop referred to him as “a bustler”.

He was the Lancashire club captain from 1908 until 1914. During World War I he served in the Army Remount Service with the rank of Captain. He died in North Kilworth, Leicestershire.

References

1877 births
1952 deaths
English cricketers
Cambridge University cricketers
Gentlemen cricketers
Lancashire cricketers
Marylebone Cricket Club cricketers
North v South cricketers
Lancashire cricket captains
People from the Borough of Cheshire East
People educated at Harrow School
Alumni of Trinity College, Cambridge
British Army personnel of World War I
People from Harborough District
Cricketers from Leicestershire
Oxford University Authentics cricketers
Military personnel from Cheshire